Stephen Willats (born 1943 in London) is a British artist. He lives and works in London.

Stephen Willats is a pioneer of conceptual art. Since the early 1960s he has created work concerned with extending the territory in which art functions. His work has involved interdisciplinary processes and theory from sociology, systems analysis, cybernetics, semiotics and philosophy.

Works
His multi-media projects often engage visitors to participate in creative social processes. Notable projects include Multiple Clothing (1965–1998), The West London Social Resource Project (1972), and the book Art and Social Function: Three Projects (1976). Willats considers Art and Social Function as a "kind of manual or tool that would be relevant to any artist thinking of enacting different paradigms for an art intervening in the fabric of society".

His 1973 work Meta Filter consisted of pairs of participants seated at a computer, attempting to reach an agreement about the meanings of various images and statements.

Stephen Willats ran the Centre for Behavioural Art, a cross-disciplinary research and discussion platform he established at Gallery House, London, in 1972–73. The Artist as an Instigator of Changes in Social Cognition and Behaviour is a publication originally published in 1973 and re-issued in 2010 by Occasional Papers. The essay includes rigorous analyses of social forms of artistic production and descriptions of a number of projects by Willats.

He has produced a number of extended projects working with residents of public housing estates across Europe. Examples include Pat Purdy and the Glue Sniffers' Club (1981-2), The Kids are in the Street (1981-2) and Are You Good Enough for the Cha Cha Cha? (1982), about, respectively, wasteland outside the Avondale estate in West London, a skateboard park near a Brixton housing estate, and a London punk music club. For Brentford Towers (1985) Willats worked with residents to map the interiors of their homes, identifying objects holding personal significance.

His works are held in the collections of the Tate, the National Portrait Gallery, and the Henry Moore Institute.

References

External links
Tate Modern: Talks & Discussions: MULTIPLE CLOTHING: Message, Interaction, Exchange: Stephen Willats
Stephen Willats biography at Victoria Miro Gallery
Jane Kelly, Stephen Willats: Art, Ethnography and Social Change, Variant, Issue 4, Autumn 1997
Stephen Willats at Galerie Nagel, Cologne, Germany, Frieze, Issue 98, April 2006
'Control' Publication edited by Stephen Willats since 1965

1943 births
Living people
British conceptual artists
English contemporary artists